Thomas Neill (18 September 1867 – 1949) was a New Zealand cricketer. He played two first-class matches for Auckland between 1892 and 1898.

See also
 List of Auckland representative cricketers

References

External links
 

1867 births
1949 deaths
Auckland cricketers
Cricketers from Greenock
New Zealand cricketers